Cedeño may refer to:

Places
 Cedeño Municipality, Bolívar, one of the eleven municipalities of the state of Bolívar, Venezuela
 Cedeño Municipality, Monagas, one of the thirteen municipalities of the state of Monagas, Venezuela
Cedeño, Honduras, a municipality near the mouth of the Choluteca River

People
Andújar Cedeño (1969–2000), Dominican baseball player
César Cedeño (born 1951), Dominican baseball player
Dario Cedeño (born 1991), Ecuadorian football defender
David Vélez Cedeño (born 1995), Ecuadorian footballer
Domingo Cedeño (born 1968), Dominican baseball player
Eligio Cedeño (born 1964), Venezuelan banker
Guayo Cedeño (born 1974), Honduran musician and producer
Ileana Espinel Cedeño (1933–2001), Ecuadorian journalist, poet and writer
Juan Cedeño (born 1983), Dominican baseball player
Jean Cedeño (born 1985), Panamanian footballer
José Cedeño (disambiguation)
José Antonio Cedeño (born 1939), self-taught Cuban artist specializing in sculpture
José Dimas Cedeño Delgado (born 1933), Panamanian Roman Catholic archbishop
Leandro Cedeño (born 1998), Venezuelan baseball player
Lumidee Cedeño (born 1984), American singer-songwriter and rapper
Matt Cedeño (born 1974), American television actor and former male fashion model
Melwin Cedeño (born 1964), Puerto Rican actor, comedian, musician, host, and singer
Rafael Cedeño Hernández, imprisoned Mexican drug trafficker
Raquel Rodríguez Cedeño (born 1993), Costa Rican international soccer player
Roger Cedeño (born 1974), Venezuelan baseball player
Ronny Cedeño (born 1983), Venezuelan baseball player
Rubén Cedeño (born 1952), Venezuelan musician, composer, painter, writer and speaker on metaphysical subjects
Xavier Cedeño (born 1986), Puerto Rican baseball player
Margarita Cedeño de Fernández (born 1965), Vice-President of the Dominican Republic

See also
Cedeno Patrick (born 1983), indoor American football defensive back
Frank Cedeno (born 1958), Filipino former professional boxer
Yosdenis Cedeno (born 1985), Cuban-American mixed martial artist
Cedano, a surname